From the Drain is a 1967 short film directed by David Cronenberg.

Plot summary

The film is centered on two men in a bathtub; it is implied that they are veterans of some past conflict but revealed that they are currently in a mental institution. The first man is paranoid about the drain of the tub, the second indifferent to it. After the conversation between the two men progresses, a vine-like tendril emerges from the drain to strangle the first man. The second shows no emotion to this sudden turn of events and the film ends.

Release 
The film was shown in June 1967 at the Cinethon festival.

Home video
The short was included along with Cronenberg's other early films on a bonus disc in Arrow Video's 2015 UK Blu-ray release of Videodrome. This bonus disc, entitled David Cronenberg's Early Works was later released on its own a year later.

References

External links
 

1967 films
English-language Canadian films
Canadian avant-garde and experimental short films
Canadian science fiction short films
Films directed by David Cronenberg
Canadian student films
1960s English-language films
1960s Canadian films